Bujwid is a Polish-Lithuanian nobility family name belonging to the Ślepowron coat of arms. The archaic feminine form is Bujwidowa (literally meaning "Bujwid's"). In modern time it is a unisex surname. Bujwid is a Polish form of the Lithuanian two-syllable archaic (sur)name Buivydas or Buitvydas — from buitis, būtis being, to be and (iš)vysti to see, literally to be born. Modern form is Buividas (Andris Buividas).

The Latvian form of the surname is Buivids. The Russified forms are Buivid or Buyvid.

The surname may refer to:

Odo Bujwid (1857-1942), Polish bacteriologist
Kazimiera Bujwidowa (1867-1932), Polish feminist and suffragette
Ona Danutė Buivydaitė (born 1947), Lithuanian artist and designer. 
Jānis Buivids (1864-1937), a general in the Latvian Army.
Vita Buivid (born 1962), Russian artist
Ray Buivid (1915-1972), American football player

See also
Buivydžiai — a town in Vilnius district municipality
Buivydas — a lake in Švenčionys district municipality
 There are 6 villages in Lithuania named Buivydai.
 Buivydiškės – a village in Vilnius district municipality.

References

Polish-language surnames
Lithuanian-language surnames